Renée A. Fladen (born 3 August 1948, New York City) — known as Renée Fladen-Kamm — is an American singer and vocal coach. Among her recordings are those of medieval music as vocal director of the San Francisco based Sherwood Consort. She also worked on musical direction of theatrical works directed by Mary Devlin, another member of the Sherwood Consort.

Fladen is recorded as the inspiration of the Left Banke songs "Walk Away Renée" (1966), "Pretty Ballerina" (1966) and "She May Call You Up Tonight" (1967).

Fladen married Howard I. Kamm (born 1946) in 1967; the couple divorced in San Francisco in 1974.

References

American women singers
Living people
Musicians from the San Francisco Bay Area
Singers from California
Muses
1948 births
21st-century American women